The men's sabre was one of eight fencing events on the fencing at the 1968 Summer Olympics programme. It was the sixteenth appearance of the event. The competition was held from 16 to 17 October 1968. 40 fencers from 16 nations competed. Nations had been limited to three fencers each since 1928. The event was won by Jerzy Pawłowski of Poland, breaking a nine-Games string of Hungarian victories in the event. Hungary's best result in the event was Tibor Pézsa's bronze; Pézsa beat Pawłowski in the final pool but the Hungarian lost two other bouts while the Pole was otherwise flawless. Mark Rakita of the Soviet Union lost only to Pawłowski in the final pool, forcing another bout to break the tie between them for gold and silver; that barrage bout was decided by a single point as Pawłowski beat Rakita 5–4.

Pawłowski and Pézsa were the sixth and seventh men to win multiple medals in the individual men's sabre. Pawłowski's gold medal was Poland's first in the event, tying the nation with Cuba, France, Greece, and Italy for second-most all-time, behind Hungary's 11.

Background

This was the 16th appearance of the event, which is the only fencing event to have been held at every Summer Olympics. Six of the eight quarterfinalists from 1964 returned: gold medalist Tibor Pézsa of Hungary, silver medalist Claude Arabo of France, bronze medalist Umar Mavlikhanov of the Soviet Union, fifth-place finisher Emil Ochyra of Poland, sixth-place finisher Marcel Parent of France, and seventh-place finisher Walter Kostner of the United Team of Germany (now competing for West Germany). 

The only time that Hungary had competed in the men's sabre event and not won the gold medal was 1900 (Hungarians placed fourth and fifth that Games). Hungary had not competed in the event in 1896 or 1904. Beginning in 1908, the Hungarians were unbeatable. Coming into the 1968 Games, Hungary had won 9 straight gold medals and 11 of the past 12—missing the gold medal only in 1920 when the nation was not invited to the Games following World War I. Pézsa, defending Olympic champion and 1967 world championship bronze medalist, was the nation's strongest hope of keeping that streak alive, but he faced stiff competition. Jerzy Pawłowski of Poland had taken the Olympic bronze medal in 1956, won the world championship in 1957, placed sixth at the 1960 Olympics, finished in the top 16 at the 1964 Olympics, won the world championship again in 1965 and 1966, and finished second in the world championship in 1967. Mark Rakita of the Soviet Union was the reigning world champion, winning over Pawłowski and Pézsa.

West Germany, competing separately for the first time, made its debut in the men's sabre. Italy made its 14th appearance in the event, most of any nation, having missed the inaugural 1896 event and the 1904 St. Louis Games.

Competition format

The 1968 tournament continued to use a mix of pool play and knockout rounds, but with substantial changes from 1964. The first two rounds were round-robin pool play, followed by a knockout round, finishing with another pool for the final. Early-round barrages were eliminated and the knockout round was a modified double elimination round.

 Round 1: 6 pools, with 6 or 7 fencers in each pool. The top 4 fencers in each pool advanced, cutting the field from 40 to 24.
 Round 2: 4 pools, with 6 fencers per pool. Again, the top 4 fencers advanced, reducing the number of remaining fencers from 24 to 16.
 Knockout round: This was a modified double-elimination tournament. The 16 fencers were divided into 4 groups of 4. The winner of the "winners bracket" in each group advanced to the final pool. The winner of the "losers bracket" from each group faced the winner of a different group's "losers bracket," with the winner of that match advancing to the final pool as well. The knockout round winnowed the fencers from 16 to 6.
 Final round: A final pool with the 6 remaining fencers determined the medals and 4th through 6th place. A barrage was used if necessary.

Schedule

All times are Central Standard Time (UTC-6)

Results

Round 1

Round 1 Pool A

Round 1 Pool B

Round 1 Pool C

Round 1 Pool D

Round 1 Pool E

Round 1 Pool F

Round 2

Round 2 Pool A

Round 2 Pool B

Round 2 Pool C

Round 2 Pool D

Double elimination rounds

Winners brackets

Winners group 1

Winners group 2

Winners group 3

Winners group 4

Losers brackets

Losers group 1

Losers group 2

Final round 

 Barrage

References

Sabre men
Men's events at the 1968 Summer Olympics